Billy Talent is a Canadian rock band formed in 1993 in Mississauga, Ontario. The band consists of Benjamin Kowalewicz (vocals), Ian D'Sa (guitar and vocals), Jonathan Gallant (bass and vocals), and Aaron Solowoniuk (drums and percussion). Billy Talent has released five studio albums Billy Talent (2003), Billy Talent II (2006), Billy Talent III (2009), Dead Silence (2012), and Afraid of Heights (2016). Billy Talent and Billy Talent II have been certified by the Canadian Recording Industry Association as triple platinum and double platinum respectively.

Two of the band's albums have reached the top 10 on the Canadian Albums Chart: Billy Talent peaked at number six and Billy Talent II peaked at number one. Billy Talent has received a significant amount of recognition in Canada, winning eleven awards from 34 nominations at the MuchMusic Video Awards and seven awards from twenty-two nominations at the Juno Awards. The band was also nominated at the MuchMusic Video Awards every year from 2004 to 2011. Overall, Billy Talent has received twenty-six awards from 64 nominations.

CASBY Awards
The CASBY Awards are awarded for independent and alternative music, and are presented annually by CFNY, a Toronto radio station. Billy Talent has received six awards from six nominations.

|-
|2003 || "Try Honesty" || Favorite New Single || 
|-
|rowspan="2"| 2004 || "River Below" || Favorite New Single || 
|-
| Billy Talent || Favorite New Album || 
|-
|rowspan="2"| 2006 || "Devil In A Midnight Mass" || Favorite New Single || 
|-
| Billy Talent II || Favorite New Album || 
|-
|2016 || Afraid of Heights || Favorite New Album ||

ECHO Awards
The ECHO Awards is a German annual music awards ceremony established by the Deutsche Phono-Akademie. Billy Talent has received two awards from two nominations.

|-
|rowspan="2"| 2007 ||rowspan="2"| Billy Talent || Best Newcomer International || 
|-
| Best Rock/Alternative International ||

Juno Awards
The Juno Awards are presented by the Canadian Academy of Recording Arts and Sciences. Billy Talent has received seven awards from twenty-two nominations.

|-
|rowspan="3"| 2004 || Billy Talent || Best New Group of the Year || 
|-
| Billy Talent || Rock Album of the Year || 
|-
| "Try Honesty" || Single of the Year || 
|-
|rowspan="3"| 2005 || Billy Talent || Group of the Year || 
|-
| Billy Talent || Best Album of the Year || 
|-
| "River Below" || Single of the Year || 
|-
|rowspan="5"| 2007 || Billy Talent || Group of the Year || 
|-
|rowspan="2"| Billy Talent II || Rock Album of the Year || 
|-
| Album of the Year || 
|-
|rowspan="2"| "Devil in a Midnight Mass" || Video of the Year || 
|-
| Single of the Year || 
|-
| 2008 || 666 || Music DVD of the Year || 
|-
|rowspan="4"| 2010 || Billy Talent || Group of the Year || 
|-
|rowspan="2"| Billy Talent III || Rock Album of the Year || 
|-
|Album of the Year || 
|-
|rowspan="1"| "Rusted from the Rain" || Single of the Year || 
|-
|rowspan="1"| 2011 || "Saint Veronika" || Video of the Year || 
|-
|rowspan="3"| 2013 || Billy Talent || Group of the Year || 
|-
|Dead Silence || Rock Album of the Year || 
|-
|"Viking Death March" || Single of the Year || 
|-
|rowspan="2"| 2017 || Billy Talent || Group of the Year || 
|-
|Afraid of Heights || Rock Album of the Year ||

MuchMusic Video Awards
The MuchMusic Video Awards is an annual awards ceremony presented by the Canadian music video channel MuchMusic. Billy Talent has received 10 awards from 34 nominations. They have also made history by having more nominations than any other artist

|-
|rowspan="6"| 2004 ||rowspan="5"| "Try Honesty" || Best Rock Video || 
|-
| Best Video || 
|-
| Best Cinematography || 
|-
| Best Post-Production || 
|-
| Best Director || 
|-
| Billy Talent || People's Choice: Favourite Canadian Group || 
|-
|rowspan="8"| 2005 ||rowspan="3"| "River Below" || Best Video || 
|-
| Best Rock Video || 
|-
| Best Post-Production || 
|-
|rowspan="3"| "Nothing to Lose" || Best Video || 
|-
| Best Rock Video || 
|-
| Best Cinematography || 
|-
| "River Below", "Nothing to Lose" || Best Director || 
|-
| Billy Talent || People's Choice: Favourite Canadian Group || 
|-
|rowspan="5"| 2006 ||rowspan="5"| "Devil In A Midnight Mass" || Best Video || 
|-
| Best Director || 
|-
| Best Post-Production || 
|-
| Best Cinematography || 
|-
| Best Rock Video || 
|-
|rowspan="5"| 2007 ||rowspan="2"| "Fallen Leaves" || Best Video || 
|-
| MuchLoud Best Rock Video || 
|-
| "Devil In A Midnight Mass" || People's Choice: Favorite Canadian Group || 
|-
|rowspan="2"| "Red Flag" || Best Director || 
|-
| Best Cinematography || 
|-
| 2008 || "Surrender" || People's Choice: Favorite Canadian Group || 
|-
| 2009 || "Rusted From the Rain" || International Video of the Year by a Canadian || 
|-
|rowspan="3"| 2010 || "Saint Veronika" || Director of the Year || 
|-
|rowspan="2"| Devil on My Shoulder || MuchLOUD Rock Video of the Year || 
|-
| Video of the Year || 
|-
|rowspan="1"| 2011 || "Diamond on a Landmine" || MuchLOUD Rock Video of the Year || 
|-
|rowspan="2"| 2013 ||rowspan="2| "Surprise Surprise" || MuchLOUD Rock Video of the Year || 
|-
| Post-Production of the Year ||

References

External links
 Official site

Lists of awards received by Canadian musician